The 1995 Scottish Borders Council election for the Scottish Borders Council took place on Thursday 6 April 1995, alongside elections to the various newly created unitary councils across Scotland.

Independents won 30 of the council's 58 seats.

Aggregate results

References

1995 Scottish local elections
1995